Sunday Night at the London Roundhouse was the first live album by the English progressive rock band Nektar. It was released on vinyl in 1974 by Bacillus Records, and re-released with partially different content on CD in 2002.

Original release

The 1974 vinyl release included, on side 1, two songs recorded at a concert given by the band at the Roundhouse, Chalk Farm, London on 25 November 1973: "Desolation Valley" and "A Day in the Life of a Preacher". Side 2 was recorded at a live-in-studio jam on March 27, 1974, between the hours of 2:00 am and 5:00 am, at Chipping Norton Studios in Oxfordshire, England. An expanded recording of the jam session was later released as a separate CD under the title Unidentified Flying Abstract - Live at Chipping Norton 1974.

Track listing

2002 re-release

The 2002 release on CD featured the complete Roundhouse concert, recorded by Pye Records Mobile Studio and engineered by Vic Maile. All the tracks were mixed from the original 16-track master tapes by Paschal Byrne, Roye Albrighton, and Mark Powell at the Audio Archiving Company, London in March 2002.  The Chipping Norton Studios 1974 material (side two) was removed, but included on Unidentified Flying Abstract, also released in 2002.

Track listing

2002 release Unidentified Flying Abstract
Includes the three songs from the original side two, but removed from the 2002 reissue, plus three addition songs recorded during the jam on March 27, 1974.

Personnel
Roye Albrighton - guitar, vocals
Alan "Taff" Freeman - synthesizer, keyboards, vocals
Derek "Mo" Moore - bass, vocals
Ron Howden - percussion, drums, vocals, Smurds
Mick Brockett - lights

Notes

References

External links
The Nektar Discography 

Live progressive rock albums
1974 live albums
Nektar albums